People's Assembly — Parliament of the Republic of Abkhazia of the 7th convocation is the current convocation of the People's Assembly of partially recognized Republic of Abkhazia, elected in the 2022 Abkhazian parliamentary election.

History 

On 12 April 2022, at the first meeting of the elected parliament, Lasha Ashuba was unanimously elected speaker. Fazlybey Avidzba, Astamur Arshba and Ashot Minosyan were elected vice-speakers of the parliament. The meeting was held in the hall of the Cabinet of Ministers. The first meeting in accordance with the Constitution is chaired by the oldest deputy Fazlibey Avidzba, born 1957. Member of the Russian State Duma Konstantin Zatulin is also present at the first meeting as a guest.

Composition 
This list contains all 35 elected MPs. 33 of them were elected in the first two rounds, and two constituencies had to hold by-elections.

References 

People's Assembly of Abkhazia
 
Abkhazia